Fintona railway station served Fintona in  County Tyrone in Northern Ireland.
 
The Londonderry and Enniskillen Railway opened the station on 5 June 1853. From 1856, mainline services were withdrawn, and the station was a branch line from Fintona Junction railway station. Most passenger services on this branch line were provided by a horse-drawn tram car.

It was taken over by the Great Northern Railway (Ireland) in 1883.

It closed on 1 October 1957.

Routes

References

Disused railway stations in County Tyrone
Railway stations opened in 1853
Railway stations closed in 1957

Railway stations in Northern Ireland opened in 1853